The Bydgoszcz Basket Cup was an friendly basketball tournament hosted in August 2015 by the Polish national basketball team. The tournament consisted of four teams and was held in Bydgoszcz.

Editions

External links
Bydgoszcz Basket Cup

International basketball competitions hosted by Poland